What Men Still Talk About is a 2011 Russian comedy film directed by Dmitriy Dyachenko.

Plot 
The characters spend almost the whole New Year's Day talking about women, about how difficult it is to communicate with those who are 20 years younger than you, how to quit your mistress correctly and how to prevent typical grammatical mistakes.

Cast 
 Elena Babenko
 Leonid Barats
 Anatoliy Beliy
 Sergey Burunov
 Konstantin Chepurin
 Rostislav Khait
 Kamil Larin
 Aleksey Makarov	
 Vladimir Menshov
 Elena Podkaminskaya	
 Denis Shvedov

References

External links 
 

2011 films
2010s Russian-language films
Russian comedy films
2011 comedy films